Pierre Cabaré is a French dental technician and politician of La République En Marche! (LREM) who has been serving as a member of the French National Assembly since 18 June 2017, representing Haute-Garonne's 1st constituency.

In parliament, Cabaré serves on the Committee on Foreign Affairs. In addition to his committee assignments, he is part of the French-Kazakh Parliamentary Friendship Group, the French-Mongolian Parliamentary Friendship Group and the French-Slovenian Parliamentary Friendship Group. In 2020, Cabaré joined En commun (EC), a group within LREM led by Barbara Pompili.

See also
 2017 French legislative election

References

Year of birth missing (living people)
Living people
Deputies of the 15th National Assembly of the French Fifth Republic
La République En Marche! politicians
Place of birth missing (living people)
Members of Parliament for Haute-Garonne